Usakovo (Uśaq) is a rural locality (a village) in Starobazanovsky Selsoviet, Birsky District, Bashkortostan, Russia. The population was 223 as of 2010. There is 1 street.

Geography 
Usakovo is located 27 km southwest of Birsk (the district's administrative centre) by road. Starobazanovo is the nearest rural locality.

References 

Rural localities in Birsky District